The 2018 Okinawa gubernatorial election was held on 30 September 2018 to elect the next governor of Okinawa. As there are no term limits in Japan, incumbent Governor Takeshi Onaga was eligible for re-election before his death in August 2018. The election was originally scheduled to be held on 9 December 2018, but this was brought forward after Onaga's untimely death. Onaga's deputy, Kiichiro Jahana temporarily assumed his post for three days until being replaced as interim governor by Moritake Tomikawa. This was the first gubernatorial election in Okinawa since the voting age was lowered to 18.

The relocation of the US air base in Ginowan to Nago was a major issue in the race. The campaign period ran from 13 September until election day.

The election was won by Denny Tamaki. Tamaki, like Onaga, wants a fundamental reduction of the U.S. presence in Okinawa.

Candidates

Running 
Atsushi Sakima, mayor of Ginowan (2012–2018). (endorsed by LDP, Komeito, Nippon Ishin no Kai and Kibo)
Denny Tamaki, member of the House of Representatives for the Okinawa 3rd district (2009–2018). (supported by CDP, DPFP, JCP, LP, SDP and OSMP)
Hatsumi Toguchi, former member of the Naha City Assembly.
Shun Kaneshima, former IT company employee.

Speculative 
Takeshi Onaga, incumbent Governor, died in August 2018.

Declined 
Morimasa Goya, local businessman and Onaga ally.

Campaign 

Similar to the previous gubernatorial election, the issue of the relocation of the US air base in Ginowan to Nago dominated the campaign. The two main candidates were on opposing camps on the issue with Tamaki opposing any relocation within the prefecture and Sakima supporting the relocation. Tamaki made the relocation issue the main plank of his campaign. On the other hand, Sakima downplayed the relocation issue and instead focused on the local economy in his pitch. Voters that cited the base relocation as their most important issue mostly supported Tamaki, while those more concerned with the economy supported Sakima.

Results 
The exit poll on election night indicated a large victory for Tamaki and the NHK called the election for Tamaki early during the count. He gained 396,632 votes, the most votes ever obtained by a candidate in an Okinawa-wide election.

Breakdown

References 

2018 elections in Japan
2018